Kumlekul (Qomlokül) is a rural locality (a selo) in Krasnoyarsky Selsoviet, Ufimsky District, Bashkortostan, Russia. The population was 748 as of 2010. There are 14 streets.

Geography 
Kumlekul is located 35 km north of Ufa (the district's administrative centre) by road. Yakshivanovo is the nearest rural locality.

References 

Rural localities in Ufimsky District